The Antigua and Barbuda National Cadet Corps (ABNCC) is a voluntary youth organization open to students between the ages of 12 and 19 in Antigua and Barbuda. It is part of the Antigua and Barbuda Defence Force. It is sponsored by the government of Antigua and Barbuda. Its main objective is to provide training and personal development to youth through both military and community activities. The training is geared to inspire young men and women to become model citizens. Emphasis during training is based on discipline, loyalty, leadership and good citizenry. This is often acquired though a completed training course of being an active member in the Corps. 

Presently, the cadet corps has around 200 active members. 
There are two categories in the National Cadet Corps: Sea Cadets, that follow Antigua and Barbuda Coast Guard training and ranks, and Infantry Cadets, that follow Antigua and Barbuda Regiment training and ranks.

References 

Military youth groups
Military of Antigua and Barbuda